Franz Kafka (3 July 1883 – 3 June 1924) was a German-speaking Bohemian novelist and short-story writer based in Prague, widely regarded as one of the major figures of 20th-century literature. His work fuses elements of realism and the fantastic. It typically features isolated protagonists facing bizarre or surrealistic predicaments and incomprehensible socio-bureaucratic powers. It has been interpreted as exploring themes of alienation, existential anxiety, guilt, and absurdity. His best known works include the short story "The Metamorphosis" and novels The Trial and The Castle. The term Kafkaesque has entered English to describe absurd situations, like those depicted in his writing.

Kafka was born into a middle-class German-speaking Czech Jewish family in Prague, the capital of the Kingdom of Bohemia, then part of the Austro-Hungarian Empire, today the capital of the Czech Republic. He trained as a lawyer and after completing his legal education was employed full-time by an insurance company, forcing him to relegate writing to his spare time. Over the course of his life, Kafka wrote hundreds of letters to family and close friends, including his father, with whom he had a strained and formal relationship. He became engaged to several women but never married. He died in obscurity in 1924 at the age of 40 from tuberculosis.

Kafka was a prolific writer, spending most of his free time writing, often late in the night. He burned an estimated 90 per cent of his total work due to his persistent struggles with self-doubt. Much of the remaining 10 per cent is lost or otherwise unpublished. Few of Kafka's works were published during his lifetime: the story collections Contemplation and A Country Doctor, and individual stories (such as "The Metamorphosis") were published in literary magazines but received little public attention.

Franz Kafka is among those artists who reached fame only after their deaths: it was only after 1945 that his work became famous in German-speaking countries, whose literature it has since greatly influenced, and in the 1960s elsewhere in the world. Kafka's work has influenced a range of writers, critics, artists, and philosophers during the 20th and 21st centuries.

Life

Early life 

Kafka was born near the Old Town Square in Prague, then part of the Austro-Hungarian Empire. His family were German-speaking middle-class Ashkenazi Jews. Hermann brought the Kafka family to Prague. After working as a travelling sales representative, he eventually became a fashion retailer who employed up to 15 people and used the image of a jackdaw ( in Czech, pronounced and colloquially written as kafka) as his business logo. Kafka's mother, Julie (1856–1934), was the daughter of Jakob Löwy, a prosperous retail merchant in Poděbrady, and was better educated than her husband.

Kafka's parents probably spoke a German influenced by Yiddish that was sometimes pejoratively called Mauscheldeutsch, but, as German was considered the vehicle of social mobility, they probably encouraged their children to speak Standard German. Hermann and Julie had six children, of whom Franz was the eldest. Franz's two brothers, Georg and Heinrich, died in infancy before Franz was seven; his three sisters were Gabriele ("Ellie") (1889–1944), Valerie ("Valli") (1890–1942) and Ottilie ("Ottla") (1892–1943). All three were murdered in the Holocaust of World War II. Valli was deported to the Łódź Ghetto in occupied Poland in 1942, but that is the last documentation of her; it is assumed she did not survive the war. Ottilie was Kafka's favourite sister.

Hermann is described by the biographer Stanley Corngold as a "huge, selfish, overbearing businessman" and by Franz Kafka as "a true Kafka in strength, health, appetite, loudness of voice, eloquence, self-satisfaction, worldly dominance, endurance, presence of mind, [and] knowledge of human nature". On business days, both parents were absent from the home, with Julie Kafka working as many as 12 hours each day helping to manage the family business. Consequently, Kafka's childhood was somewhat lonely, and the children were reared largely by a series of governesses and servants. Kafka's troubled relationship with his father is evident in his  (Letter to His Father) of more than 100 pages, in which he complains of being profoundly affected by his father's authoritarian and demanding character; his mother, in contrast, was quiet and shy. The dominating figure of Kafka's father had a significant influence on Kafka's writing.

The Kafka family had a servant girl living with them in a cramped apartment. Franz's room was often cold. In November 1913 the family moved into a bigger apartment, although Ellie and Valli had married and moved out of the first apartment. In early August 1914, just after World War I began, the sisters did not know where their husbands were in the military and moved back in with the family in this larger apartment. Both Ellie and Valli also had children. Franz at age 31 moved into Valli's former apartment, quiet by contrast, and lived by himself for the first time.

Education 

His Jewish education ended with his bar mitzvah celebration at the age of 13. Kafka never enjoyed attending the synagogue and went with his father only on four high holidays a year.

After leaving elementary school in 1893, Kafka was admitted to the rigorous classics-oriented state gymnasium, an academic secondary school at Old Town Square, within the Kinský Palace. German was the language of instruction, but Kafka also spoke and wrote in Czech. He studied the latter at the gymnasium for eight years, achieving good grades. Although Kafka received compliments for his Czech, he never considered himself fluent in the language, though he spoke German with a Czech accent. He completed his Matura exams in 1901.

Although this field did not excite him, it offered a range of career possibilities which pleased his father. In addition, law required a longer course of study, giving Kafka time to take classes in German studies and art history. He also joined a student club,  (Reading and Lecture Hall of the German students), which organised literary events, readings and other activities. Among Kafka's friends were the journalist Felix Weltsch, who studied philosophy, the actor Yitzchak Lowy who came from an orthodox Hasidic Warsaw family, and the writers Ludwig Winder, Oskar Baum and Franz Werfel.

At the end of his first year of studies, Kafka met Max Brod, a fellow law student who became a close friend for life. Years later, Brod coined the term  ("The Close Prague Circle") to describe the group of writers, which included Kafka, Felix Weltsch and Brod himself. Brod soon noticed that, although Kafka was shy and seldom spoke, what he said was usually profound. Kafka considered Fyodor Dostoyevsky, Gustav Flaubert, Nikolai Gogol, Franz Grillparzer, and Heinrich von Kleist to be his "true blood brothers". Besides these, he took an interest in Czech literature and was also very fond of the works of Goethe. Kafka was awarded the degree of Doctor of Law on 18 June 1906 and performed an obligatory year of unpaid service as law clerk for the civil and criminal courts.

Employment 

His correspondence during that period indicates that he was unhappy with a work schedule—from 08:00 until 18:00—that made it extremely difficult to concentrate on writing, which was assuming increasing importance to him. On 15 July 1908, he resigned. Two weeks later, he found employment more amenable to writing when he joined the Worker's Accident Insurance Institute for the Kingdom of Bohemia. The job involved investigating and assessing compensation for personal injury to industrial workers; accidents such as lost fingers or limbs were commonplace, owing to poor work safety policies at the time. It was especially true of factories fitted with machine lathes, drills, planing machines and rotary saws, which were rarely fitted with safety guards.

The management professor Peter Drucker credits Kafka with developing the first civilian hard hat while employed at the Worker's Accident Insurance Institute, but this is not supported by any document from his employer. Kafka was rapidly promoted and his duties included processing and investigating compensation claims, writing reports, and handling appeals from businessmen who thought their firms had been placed in too high a risk category, which cost them more in insurance premiums. He would compile and compose the annual report on the insurance institute for the several years he worked there. The reports were well received by his superiors. Kafka usually got off work at 2 p.m., so that he had time to spend on his literary work, to which he was committed. Kafka's father also expected him to help out at and take over the family fancy goods store. In his later years, Kafka's illness often prevented him from working at the insurance bureau and at his writing.

In late 1911, Elli's husband Karl Hermann and Kafka became partners in the first asbestos factory in Prague, known as Prager Asbestwerke Hermann & Co., having used dowry money from Hermann Kafka. Kafka showed a positive attitude at first, dedicating much of his free time to the business, but he later resented the encroachment of this work on his writing time. During that period, he also found interest and entertainment in the performances of Yiddish theatre. After seeing a Yiddish theatre troupe perform in October 1911, for the next six months Kafka "immersed himself in Yiddish language and in Yiddish literature". This interest also served as a starting point for his growing exploration of Judaism. It was at about this time that Kafka became a vegetarian. Around 1915, Kafka received his draft notice for military service in World WarI, but his employers at the insurance institute arranged for a deferment because his work was considered essential government service. He later attempted to join the military but was prevented from doing so by medical problems associated with tuberculosis, with which he was diagnosed in 1917. In 1918, the Worker's Accident Insurance Institute put Kafka on a pension due to his illness, for which there was no cure at the time, and he spent most of the rest of his life in sanatoriums.

Private life 
Kafka never married. According to Brod, Kafka was "tortured" by sexual desire, and Kafka's biographer Reiner Stach states that his life was full of "incessant womanising" and that he was filled with a fear of "sexual failure". Kafka visited brothels for most of his adult life, and was interested in pornography. In addition, he had close relationships with several women during his lifetime. On 13 August 1912, Kafka met Felice Bauer, a relative of Brod, who worked in Berlin as a representative of a dictaphone company. A week after the meeting at Brod's home, Kafka wrote in his diary:

Kafka and Felice Bauer communicated mostly through letters over the next five years, met occasionally, and were engaged twice. According to the biographers Stach and James Hawes, Kafka became engaged a third time around 1920, to Julie Wohryzek, a poor and uneducated hotel chambermaid. Although the two rented a flat and set a wedding date, the marriage never took place. During this time, Kafka began a draft of Letter to His Father, who objected to Julie because of her Zionist beliefs. Before the date of the intended marriage, he took up with yet another woman. While he needed women and sex in his life, he had low self-confidence, felt sex was dirty, and was cripplingly shy—especially about his body.

Stach and Brod state that during the time that Kafka knew Felice Bauer, he had an affair with a friend of hers, Margarethe "Grete" Bloch, a Jewish woman from Berlin. Brod says that Bloch gave birth to Kafka's son, although Kafka never knew about the child. The boy, whose name is not known, was born in 1914 or 1915 and died in Munich in 1921. However, Kafka's biographer Peter-André Alt says that, while Bloch had a son, Kafka was not the father as the pair were never intimate. Stach points out that there is a great deal of contradictory evidence around the claim that Kafka was the father.

Kafka was diagnosed with tuberculosis in August 1917 and moved for a few months to the Bohemian village of Zürau (Siřem in Czech), where his sister Ottla worked on the farm of her brother-in-law Karl Hermann. He felt comfortable there and later described this time as perhaps the best period of his life, probably because he had no responsibilities. From the notes in these books, Kafka extracted 109 numbered pieces of text on Zettel, single pieces of paper in no given order.

In 1920, Kafka began an intense relationship with Milena Jesenská, a Czech journalist and writer. During a vacation in July 1923 to Graal-Müritz on the Baltic Sea, Kafka met Dora Diamant, a 25-year-old kindergarten teacher from an orthodox Jewish family. Kafka, hoping to escape the influence of his family to concentrate on his writing, moved briefly to Berlin (September 1923-March 1924) and lived with Diamant. She became his lover and sparked his interest in the Talmud. He worked on four stories, all of which were intended for publication, including  (A Hunger Artist).

Personality 
Kafka had a lifelong suspicion that people found him mentally and physically repulsive. However, many of those who met him invariably found him to possess obvious intelligence and a sense of humour; they also found him handsome, although of austere appearance.

Brod compared Kafka to Heinrich von Kleist, noting that both writers had the ability to describe a situation realistically with precise details. Brod thought Kafka was one of the most entertaining people he had met; Kafka enjoyed sharing humour with his friends, but also helped them in difficult situations with good advice. According to Brod, he was a passionate reciter, able to phrase his speech as though it were music. Brod felt that two of Kafka's most distinguishing traits were "absolute truthfulness" and "precise conscientiousness". He explored details, the inconspicuous, in depth and with such love and precision that things surfaced that were unforeseen, seemingly strange, but absolutely true.

Although Kafka showed little interest in exercise as a child, he later developed a passion for games and physical activity, and was an accomplished rider, swimmer, and rower. On weekends, he and his friends embarked on long hikes, often planned by Kafka himself. His other interests included alternative medicine, modern education systems such as Montessori, and technological novelties such as airplanes and film. Writing was vitally important to Kafka; he considered it a "form of prayer". He was highly sensitive to noise and preferred absolute quiet when writing.

Pérez-Álvarez has claimed that Kafka may have possessed a schizoid personality disorder. His style, it is claimed, not only in "Die Verwandlung" ("The Metamorphosis"), but in various other writings, appears to show low to medium-level schizoid traits, which Pérez-Álvarez claims to have influenced much of his work. His anguish can be seen in this diary entry from 21 June 1913:

and in Zürau Aphorism number 50:

Alessia Coralli and Antonio Perciaccante of San Giovanni di Dio Hospital have posited that Kafka may have had borderline personality disorder with co-occurring psychophysiological insomnia. Joan Lachkar interpreted Die Verwandlung as "a vivid depiction of the borderline personality" and described the story as "model for Kafka's own abandonment fears, anxiety, depression, and parasitic dependency needs. Kafka illuminated the borderline's general confusion of normal and healthy desires, wishes, and needs with something ugly and disdainful."

Though Kafka never married, he held marriage and children in high esteem. He had several girlfriends and lovers across his life. He may have suffered from an eating disorder. Doctor Manfred M. Fichter of the Psychiatric Clinic, University of Munich, presented "evidence for the hypothesis that the writer Franz Kafka had suffered from an atypical anorexia nervosa", and that Kafka was not just lonely and depressed but also "occasionally suicidal". In his 1995 book Franz Kafka, the Jewish Patient, Sander Gilman investigated "why a Jew might have been considered 'hypochondriacal' or 'homosexual' and how Kafka incorporates aspects of these ways of understanding the Jewish male into his own self-image and writing". Kafka considered suicide at least once, in late 1912.

Political views 

Before World War I, Kafka attended several meetings of the Klub mladých, a Czech anarchist, anti-militarist, and anti-clerical organization. Hugo Bergmann, who attended the same elementary and high schools as Kafka, fell out with Kafka during their last academic year (1900–1901) because "[Kafka's] socialism and my Zionism were much too strident". "Franz became a socialist, I became a Zionist in 1898. The synthesis of Zionism and socialism did not yet exist". Bergmann claims that Kafka wore a red carnation to school to show his support for socialism. In one diary entry, Kafka made reference to the influential anarchist philosopher Peter Kropotkin: "Don't forget Kropotkin!"

During the communist era, the legacy of Kafka's work for Eastern bloc socialism was hotly debated. Opinions ranged from the notion that he satirised the bureaucratic bungling of a crumbling Austro-Hungarian Empire, to the belief that he embodied the rise of socialism. A further key point was Marx's theory of alienation. While the orthodox position was that Kafka's depictions of alienation were no longer relevant for a society that had supposedly eliminated alienation, a 1963 conference held in Liblice, Czechoslovakia, on the eightieth anniversary of his birth, reassessed the importance of Kafka's portrayal of bureaucracy. Whether or not Kafka was a political writer is still an issue of debate.

Judaism and Zionism 

Kafka grew up in Prague as a German-speaking Jew. He was deeply fascinated by the Jews of Eastern Europe, who he thought possessed an intensity of spiritual life that was absent from Jews in the West. His diary contains many references to Yiddish writers. Yet he was at times alienated from Judaism and Jewish life. On 8 January 1914, he wrote in his diary:

In his adolescent years, Kafka declared himself an atheist.

Hawes suggests that Kafka, though very aware of his own Jewishness, did not incorporate it into his work, which, according to Hawes, lacks Jewish characters, scenes or themes. In the opinion of literary critic Harold Bloom, although Kafka was uneasy with his Jewish heritage, he was the quintessential Jewish writer. Lothar Kahn is likewise unequivocal: "The presence of Jewishness in Kafka's  is no longer subject to doubt". Pavel Eisner, one of Kafka's first translators, interprets  (The Trial) as the embodiment of the "triple dimension of Jewish existence in Prague... his protagonist Josef K. is (symbolically) arrested by a German (Rabensteiner), a Czech (Kullich), and a Jew (Kaminer). He stands for the 'guiltless guilt' that imbues the Jew in the modern world, although there is no evidence that he himself is a Jew".

In his essay Sadness in Palestine?!, Dan Miron explores Kafka's connection to Zionism: "It seems that those who claim that there was such a connection and that Zionism played a central role in his life and literary work, and those who deny the connection altogether or dismiss its importance, are both wrong. The truth lies in some very elusive place between these two simplistic poles." Kafka considered moving to Palestine with Felice Bauer, and later with Dora Diamant. He studied Hebrew while living in Berlin, hiring a friend of Brod's from Palestine, Pua Bat-Tovim, to tutor him and attending Rabbi Julius Grünthal and Rabbi Julius Guttmann's classes in the Berlin  (College for the Study of Judaism).

Livia Rothkirchen calls Kafka the "symbolic figure of his era". His contemporaries included numerous Jewish, Czech, and German writers who were sensitive to Jewish, Czech, and German culture. According to Rothkirchen, "This situation lent their writings a broad cosmopolitan outlook and a quality of exaltation bordering on transcendental metaphysical contemplation. An illustrious example is Franz Kafka".

Towards the end of his life Kafka sent a postcard to his friend Hugo Bergmann in Tel Aviv, announcing his intention to emigrate to Palestine. Bergmann refused to host Kafka because he had young children and was afraid that Kafka would infect them with tuberculosis.

Death

Kafka's laryngeal tuberculosis worsened and in March 1924 he returned from Berlin to Prague, where members of his family, principally his sister Ottla and Dora Diamant, took care of him. He went to Dr. Hoffmann's sanatorium in Kierling just outside Vienna for treatment on 10 April, and died there on 3 June 1924. The cause of death seemed to be starvation: the condition of Kafka's throat made eating too painful for him, and since parenteral nutrition had not yet been developed, there was no way to feed him. Kafka was editing "A Hunger Artist" on his deathbed, a story whose composition he had begun before his throat closed to the point that he could not take any nourishment. His body was brought back to Prague where he was buried on 11 June 1924, in the New Jewish Cemetery in Prague-Žižkov. Kafka was virtually unknown during his own lifetime, but he did not consider fame important. He rose to fame rapidly after his death, particularly after World War II. The Kafka tombstone was designed by architect Leopold Ehrmann.

Works 

All of Kafka's published works, except some letters he wrote in Czech to Milena Jesenská, were written in German. What little was published during his lifetime attracted scant public attention.

Kafka finished none of his full-length novels and burned around 90 percent of his work, much of it during the period he lived in Berlin with Diamant, who helped him burn the drafts. In his early years as a writer he was influenced by von Kleist, whose work he described in a letter to Bauer as frightening and whom he considered closer than his own family.

Kafka drew and sketched extensively. Until May 2021, only about 40 of his drawings were known. In 2022, Yale University Press published Franz Kafka: The Drawings.

Stories 

Kafka's earliest published works were eight stories which appeared in 1908 in the first issue of the literary journal Hyperion under the title  (Contemplation). He wrote the story "" ("Description of a Struggle") in 1904; he showed it to Brod in 1905 who advised him to continue writing and convinced him to submit it to Hyperion. Kafka published a fragment in 1908 and two sections in the spring of 1909, all in Munich.

In a creative outburst on the night of 22 September 1912, Kafka wrote the story "Das Urteil" ("The Judgment", literally: "The Verdict") and dedicated it to Felice Bauer. Brod noted the similarity in names of the main character and his fictional fiancée, Georg Bendemann and Frieda Brandenfeld, to Franz Kafka and Felice Bauer. The story is often considered Kafka's breakthrough work. It deals with the troubled relationship of a son and his dominant father, facing a new situation after the son's engagement. Kafka later described writing it as "a complete opening of body and soul", a story that "evolved as a true birth, covered with filth and slime". The story was first published in Leipzig in 1912 and dedicated "to Miss Felice Bauer", and in subsequent editions "for F."

In 1912, Kafka wrote "Die Verwandlung" ("The Metamorphosis", or "The Transformation"), published in 1915 in Leipzig. Critics regard the work as one of the seminal works of fiction of the 20th century. The story "In der Strafkolonie" ("In the Penal Colony"), dealing with an elaborate torture and execution device, was written in October 1914, revised in 1918, and published in Leipzig during October 1919. The story "Ein Hungerkünstler" ("A Hunger Artist"), published in the periodical  in 1924, describes a victimized protagonist who experiences a decline in the appreciation of his strange craft of starving himself for extended periods. His last story, "Josefine, die Sängerin oder Das Volk der Mäuse" ("Josephine the Singer, or the Mouse Folk"), also deals with the relationship between an artist and his audience.

Novels 

Kafka began his first novel in 1912; its first chapter is the story "Der Heizer" ("The Stoker"). He called the work, which remained unfinished,  (The Man Who Disappeared or The Missing Man), but when Brod published it after Kafka's death he named it Amerika. The inspiration for the novel was the time Kafka spent in the audience of Yiddish theatre the previous year, bringing him to a new awareness of his heritage, which led to the thought that an innate appreciation for one's heritage lives deep within each person. More explicitly humorous and slightly more realistic than most of Kafka's works, the novel shares the motif of an oppressive and intangible system putting the protagonist repeatedly in bizarre situations. It uses many details of experiences from his relatives who had emigrated to America and is the only work for which Kafka considered an optimistic ending.

In 1914 Kafka began the novel  (The Trial), the story of a man arrested and prosecuted by a remote, inaccessible authority, with the nature of his crime revealed neither to him nor to the reader. He did not complete the novel, although he finished the final chapter. According to Nobel Prize winner and Kafka scholar Elias Canetti, Felice is central to the plot of Der Process and Kafka said it was "her story". Canetti titled his book on Kafka's letters to Felice Kafka's Other Trial, in recognition of the relationship between the letters and the novel. Michiko Kakutani notes in a review for The New York Times that Kafka's letters have the "earmarks of his fiction: the same nervous attention to minute particulars; the same paranoid awareness of shifting balances of power; the same atmosphere of emotional suffocation—combined, surprisingly enough, with moments of boyish ardour and delight."

According to his diary, Kafka was already planning his novel  (The Castle), by 11 June 1914; however, he did not begin writing it until 27 January 1922. Kafka's intent was that the castle's authorities notify K. on his deathbed that his "legal claim to live in the village was not valid, yet, taking certain auxiliary circumstances into account, he was to be permitted to live and work there". Dark and at times surreal, the novel is focused on alienation, bureaucracy, the seemingly endless frustrations of man's attempts to stand against the system, and the futile and hopeless pursuit of an unattainable goal. Hartmut M. Rastalsky noted in his thesis: "Like dreams, his texts combine precise 'realistic' detail with absurdity, careful observation and reasoning on the part of the protagonists with inexplicable obliviousness and carelessness."

Publishing history 

Kafka's stories were initially published in literary periodicals. His first eight were printed in 1908 in the first issue of the bi-monthly Hyperion. Franz Blei published two dialogues in 1909 which became part of "Beschreibung eines Kampfes" ("Description of a Struggle"). A fragment of the story "Die Aeroplane in Brescia" ("The Aeroplanes at Brescia"), written on a trip to Italy with Brod, appeared in the daily Bohemia on 28 September 1909. On 27 March 1910, several stories that later became part of the book  were published in the Easter edition of Bohemia. In Leipzig during 1913, Brod and publisher Kurt Wolff included "" ("The Judgment. A Story by Franz Kafka.") in their literary yearbook for the art poetry Arkadia. In the same year, Wolff published "Der Heizer" ("The Stoker") in the Jüngste Tag series, where it enjoyed three printings. The story "" ("Before the Law") was published in the 1915 New Year's edition of the independent Jewish weekly ; it was reprinted in 1919 as part of the story collection  (A Country Doctor) and became part of the novel . Other stories were published in various publications, including Martin Buber's Der Jude, the paper , and the periodicals , Genius, and Prager Presse.

Kafka's first published book,  (Contemplation, or Meditation), was a collection of 18stories written between 1904 and 1912. Kafka dedicated it to Brod, "", and added in the personal copy given to his friend "" ("As it is already printed here, for my dearest Max").

Another story collection,  (A Country Doctor), was published by Kurt Wolff in 1919, dedicated to Kafka's father. On 20 April 1924, the  published Kafka's essay on Adalbert Stifter.

Max Brod 

Kafka left his work, both published and unpublished, to his friend and literary executor Max Brod with explicit instructions that it should be destroyed on Kafka's death; Kafka wrote: "Dearest Max, my last request: Everything I leave behind me... in the way of diaries, manuscripts, letters (my own and others'), sketches, and so on, [is] to be burned unread." Brod ignored this request and published the novels and collected works between 1925 and 1935. Brod defended his action by claiming that he had told Kafka, "I shall not carry out your wishes", and that "Franz should have appointed another executor if he had been absolutely determined that his instructions should stand". 

Brod took many of Kafka's papers, which remain unpublished, with him in suitcases to Palestine when he fled there in 1939. Kafka's last lover, Dora Diamant (later, Dymant-Lask), also ignored his wishes, secretly keeping 20notebooks and 35letters. These were confiscated by the Gestapo in 1933, but scholars continue to search for them.

As Brod published the bulk of the writings in his possession, Kafka's work began to attract wider attention and critical acclaim. Brod found it difficult to arrange Kafka's notebooks in chronological order. One problem was that Kafka often began writing in different parts of the book; sometimes in the middle, sometimes working backwards from the end. Brod finished many of Kafka's incomplete works for publication. Kurt Wolff published two other novels,  in 1926 and Amerika in 1927. Brod's sets are usually called the "Definitive Editions".

Modern editions 
In 1961 Malcolm Pasley acquired for the Oxford Bodleian Library most of Kafka's original handwritten works. Subsequently, Pasley headed a team (including Gerhard Neumann, Jost Schillemeit and Jürgen Born) which reconstructed the German novels;  republished them. Jost Schillemeit was the editor of  published in 1983. These are called the "Critical Editions" or the "Fischer Editions".

Unpublished papers 
When Brod died in 1968, he left Kafka's unpublished papers, which are believed to number in the thousands, to his secretary Esther Hoffe. She released or sold some, but left most to her daughters, Eva and Ruth, who also refused to release the papers. A court battle began in 2008 between the sisters and the National Library of Israel, which claimed these works became the property of the nation of Israel when Brod emigrated to British Palestine in 1939. A ruling by a Tel Aviv family court in 2010 held that the papers must be released and a few were, including a previously unknown story, but the legal battle continued. The Hoffes claim the papers are their personal property, while the National Library of Israel argues they are "cultural assets belonging to the Jewish people". The National Library also suggests that Brod bequeathed the papers to them in his will. The Tel Aviv Family Court ruled in October 2012, six months after Ruth's death, that the papers were the property of the National Library. The Israeli Supreme Court upheld the decision in December 2016.

Critical response

Critical interpretations 
The poet W. H. Auden called Kafka "the Dante of the twentieth century"; the novelist Vladimir Nabokov placed him among the greatest writers of the 20th century. Gabriel García Márquez noted the reading of Kafka's "The Metamorphosis" showed him "that it was possible to write in a different way". A prominent theme of Kafka's work, first established in the short story "Das Urteil", is father–son conflict: the guilt induced in the son is resolved through suffering and atonement. Other prominent themes and archetypes include alienation, physical and psychological brutality, characters on a terrifying quest, and mystical transformation.

Kafka's style has been compared to that of Kleist as early as 1916, in a review of "Die Verwandlung" and "Der Heizer" by Oscar Walzel in Berliner Beiträge. The nature of Kafka's prose allows for varied interpretations and critics have placed his writing into a variety of literary schools. Marxists, for example, have sharply disagreed over how to interpret Kafka's works. Some accused him of distorting reality whereas others claimed he was critiquing capitalism. The hopelessness and absurdity common to his works are seen as emblematic of existentialism. Some of Kafka's books are influenced by the expressionist movement, though the majority of his literary output was associated with the experimental modernist genre. Kafka also touches on the theme of human conflict with bureaucracy. William Burrows claims that such work is centred on the concepts of struggle, pain, solitude, and the need for relationships. Others, such as Thomas Mann, see Kafka's work as allegorical: a quest, metaphysical in nature, for God.

According to Gilles Deleuze and Félix Guattari, the themes of alienation and persecution, although present in Kafka's work, have been overemphasised by critics. They argue Kafka's work is more deliberate and subversive—and more joyful—than may first appear. They point out that reading the Kafka work while focusing on the futility of his characters' struggles reveals Kafka's play of humour; he is not necessarily commenting on his own problems, but rather pointing out how people tend to invent problems. In his work, Kafka often created malevolent, absurd worlds. Kafka read drafts of his works to his friends, typically concentrating on his humorous prose. The writer Milan Kundera suggests that Kafka's surrealist humour may have been an inversion of Dostoyevsky's presentation of characters who are punished for a crime. In Kafka's work, a character is punished although a crime has not been committed. Kundera believes that Kafka's inspirations for his characteristic situations came both from growing up in a patriarchal family and living in a totalitarian state.

Attempts have been made to identify the influence of Kafka's legal background and the role of law in his fiction. Most interpretations identify aspects of law and legality as important in his work, in which the legal system is often oppressive. The law in Kafka's works, rather than being representative of any particular legal or political entity, is usually interpreted to represent a collection of anonymous, incomprehensible forces. These are hidden from the individual but control the lives of the people, who are innocent victims of systems beyond their control. Critics who support this absurdist interpretation cite instances where Kafka describes himself in conflict with an absurd universe, such as the following entry from his diary:

However, James Hawes argues many of Kafka's descriptions of the legal proceedings in —metaphysical, absurd, bewildering and nightmarish as they might appear—are based on accurate and informed descriptions of German and Austrian criminal proceedings of the time, which were inquisitorial rather than adversarial. Although he worked in insurance, as a trained lawyer Kafka was "keenly aware of the legal debates of his day". In an early 21st-century publication that uses Kafka's office writings as its point of departure, Pothik Ghosh states that with Kafka, law "has no meaning outside its fact of being a pure force of domination and determination".

Translations 

The first instance of Kafka being translated into English was in 1925, when William A. Drake published "A Report for an Academy" in The New York Herald Tribune. Eugene Jolas translated Kafka's "The Judgment" for the modernist journal transition in 1928. This was published as The Castle by Secker & Warburg in England and Alfred A. Knopf in the United States. A 1941 edition, including a homage by Thomas Mann, spurred a surge in Kafka's popularity in the United States during the late 1940s. The Muirs translated all shorter works that Kafka had seen fit to print; they were published by Schocken Books in 1948 as The Penal Colony: Stories and Short Pieces, including additionally The First Long Train Journey, written by Kafka and Brod, Kafka's "A Novel about Youth", a review of Felix Sternheim's Die Geschichte des jungen Oswald, his essay on Kleist's "Anecdotes", his review of the literary magazine Hyperion, and an epilogue by Brod.

Later editions, notably those of 1954 (Dearest Father. Stories and Other Writings), included text, translated by Eithne Wilkins and Ernst Kaiser, that had been deleted by earlier publishers. Known as "Definitive Editions", they include translations of The Trial, Definitive, The Castle, Definitive, and other writings. These translations are generally accepted to have a number of biases and are considered to be dated in interpretation. Published in 1961 by Schocken Books, Parables and Paradoxes presented in a bilingual edition by Nahum N. Glatzer selected writings, drawn from notebooks, diaries, letters, short fictional works and the novel Der Process.

New translations were completed and published based on the recompiled German text of Pasley and SchillemeitThe Castle, Critical by Mark Harman (Schocken Books, 1998), The Trial, Critical by Breon Mitchell (Schocken Books, 1998), and Amerika: The Man Who Disappeared by Michael Hofmann (New Directions Publishing, 2004).

Translation problems to English 

Kafka often made extensive use of a characteristic particular to German, which permits long sentences that sometimes can span an entire page. Kafka's sentences then deliver an unexpected impact just before the full stop—this being the finalizing meaning and focus. This is due to the construction of subordinate clauses in German, which require that the verb be at the end of the sentence. Such constructions are difficult to duplicate in English, so it is up to the translator to provide the reader with the same (or at least equivalent) effect as the original text. German's more flexible word order and syntactical differences provide for multiple ways in which the same German writing can be translated into English. An example is the first sentence of Kafka's "The Metamorphosis", which is crucial to the setting and understanding of the entire story:

The sentence above also exemplifies an instance of another difficult problem facing translators: dealing with the author's intentional use of ambiguous idioms and words that have several meanings, which results in phrasing that is difficult to translate precisely. English translators often render the word  as 'insect'; in Middle German, however,  literally means 'an animal unclean for sacrifice'; in today's German, it means 'vermin'.  It is sometimes used colloquially to mean 'bug'—a very general term, unlike the scientific 'insect'. Kafka had no intention of labeling Gregor, the protagonist of the story, as any specific thing but instead wanted to convey Gregor's disgust at his transformation. Another example of this can be found in the final sentence of "Das Urteil" ("The Judgement"), with Kafka's use of the German noun . Literally,  means 'intercourse' and, as in English, can have either a sexual or a non-sexual meaning. The word is additionally used to mean 'transport' or 'traffic', therefore the sentence can also be translated as: "At that moment an unending stream of traffic crossed over the bridge." The double meaning of Verkehr is given added weight by Kafka's confession to Brod that when he wrote that final line he was thinking of "a violent ejaculation."

Legacy

Literary and cultural influence 

Unlike many famous writers, Kafka is rarely quoted by others. Instead, he is noted more for his visions and perspective. Shimon Sandbank, a professor, literary critic, and writer, identifies Kafka as having influenced Jorge Luis Borges, Albert Camus, Eugène Ionesco, J. M. Coetzee and Jean-Paul Sartre. Kafka had a strong influence on Gabriel García Márquez and the novel The Palace of Dreams by Ismail Kadare. A Financial Times literary critic credits Kafka with influencing José Saramago, and Al Silverman, a writer and editor, states that J. D. Salinger loved to read Kafka's works.
The Romanian writer Mircea Cărtărescu said "Kafka is the author I love the most and who means, for me, the gate to literature"; he also described Kafka as "the saint of literature".
Kafka has been cited as an influence on the Japanese writer Haruki Murakami, who paid homage to Kafka in his novel Kafka on the Shore with the namesake protagonist.

In 1999 a committee of 99 authors, scholars, and literary critics ranked  and  the second and ninth most significant German-language novels of the 20th century. Harold Bloom said "when he is most himself, Kafka gives us a continuous inventiveness and originality that rivals Dante and truly challenges Proust and Joyce as that of the dominant Western author of our century". Sandbank argues that despite Kafka's pervasiveness, his enigmatic style has yet to be emulated. Neil Christian Pages, a professor of German Studies and Comparative Literature at Binghamton University who specialises in Kafka's works, says Kafka's influence transcends literature and literary scholarship; it impacts visual arts, music, and popular culture. Harry Steinhauer, a professor of German and Jewish literature, says that Kafka "has made a more powerful impact on literate society than any other writer of the twentieth century". Brod said that the 20th century will one day be known as the "century of Kafka".

Michel-André Bossy writes that Kafka created a rigidly inflexible and sterile bureaucratic universe. Kafka wrote in an aloof manner full of legal and scientific terms. Yet his serious universe also had insightful humour, all highlighting the "irrationality at the roots of a supposedly rational world". His characters are trapped, confused, full of guilt, frustrated, and lacking understanding of their surreal world. Much of the post-Kafka fiction, especially science fiction, follow the themes and precepts of Kafka's universe. This can be seen in the works of authors such as George Orwell and Ray Bradbury.

The following are examples of works across a range of dramatic, literary, and musical genres which demonstrate the extent of Kafka's cultural influence:

"Kafkaesque" 

The term "Kafkaesque" is used to describe concepts and situations reminiscent of Kafka's work, particularly  (The Trial) and Die Verwandlung (The Metamorphosis). Examples include instances in which bureaucracies overpower people, often in a surreal, nightmarish milieu that evokes feelings of senselessness, disorientation, and helplessness. Characters in a Kafkaesque setting often lack a clear course of action to escape a labyrinthine situation. Kafkaesque elements often appear in existential works, but the term has transcended the literary realm to apply to real-life occurrences and situations that are incomprehensibly complex, bizarre, or illogical.

Numerous films and television works have been described as Kafkaesque, and the style is particularly prominent in dystopian science fiction. Works in this genre that have been thus described include Patrick Bokanowski's film The Angel (1982), Terry Gilliam's film Brazil (1985), and Alex Proyas' science fiction film noir, Dark City (1998). Films from other genres which have been similarly described include Roman Polanski's The Tenant (1976) and the Coen brothers' Barton Fink (1991). The television series The Prisoner and The Twilight Zone are also frequently described as Kafkaesque.

However, with common usage, the term has become so ubiquitous that Kafka scholars note it is often misused. More accurately then, according to author Ben Marcus, paraphrased in "What it Means to be Kafkaesque" by Joe Fassler in The Atlantic, "Kafka's quintessential qualities are affecting use of language, a setting that straddles fantasy and reality, and a sense of striving even in the face of bleakness—hopelessly and full of hope."

Commemorations 

3412 Kafka is an asteroid from the inner regions of the asteroid belt, approximately 6 kilometers in diameter. It was discovered on 10 January 1983 by American astronomers Randolph Kirk and Donald Rudy at Palomar Observatory in California, United States, and named after Kafka by them.

Apache Kafka, an open-source stream processing platform originally released in January 2011, is named after Kafka.

The Franz Kafka Museum in Prague is dedicated to Kafka and his work. A major component of the museum is an exhibit, The City of K. Franz Kafka and Prague, which was first shown in Barcelona in 1999, moved to the Jewish Museum in New York City, and finally established in Prague in Malá Strana (Lesser Town), along the Moldau, in 2005. The Franz Kafka Museum calls its display of original photos and documents Město K. Franz Kafka a Praha ("City K. Kafka and Prague") and aims to immerse the visitor into the world in which Kafka lived and about which he wrote.

The Franz Kafka Prize, established in 2001, is an annual literary award of the Franz Kafka Society and the City of Prague. It recognizes the merits of literature as "humanistic character and contribution to cultural, national, language and religious tolerance, its existential, timeless character, its generally human validity, and its ability to hand over a testimony about our times". The selection committee and recipients come from all over the world, but are limited to living authors who have had at least one work published in Czech. The recipient receives $10,000, a diploma, and a bronze statuette at a presentation in Prague's Old Town Hall, on the Czech State Holiday in late October.

San Diego State University operates the Kafka Project, which began in 1998 as the official international search for Kafka's last writings.

Kafka Dome is an off-axis oceanic core complex in the central Atlantic named after Kafka.

See also 
 Modernist literature

Notes

References

Citations

Sources 

 
 
 
 
 -left
 
 
 
 
 
 
 
 
 
 
 
 
 
 
 Duttlinger, Carolin (2007). Kafka and Photography. Oxford: Oxford University Press. .
 Duttlinger, Carolin (2013). The Cambridge Introduction to Franz Kafka. Cambridge: Cambridge University Press. .
 
 
 
 
 
 
 
 
 
 
 
 
 
 
 
 
 
 
 
 
 
 
 

 
 
 
 
 
 
 
 
 
 
 
 
 
 
 
 

Journals
  PDF Version 
 
 
 
 
 
 
 
 
 
 

 
 
 
 
 
 
 
 
 
 
 
 
 
 
 
 
 
 
 
 
 

Newspapers
 
 
 
 
 
 
 
 
 
 
 
 
 
 
 
 
 
 
 
 
 
 

Online sources

Further reading 

 
 
 
 
 
 
 
 
 
 
 
 
 
 
 
 
 
 
 
 
 
 
 
 Robertson, Ritchie, Kafka: A Very Short Introduction (Oxford: OUP, 2004); illustrated edition titled Kafka: A Brief Insight (New York: Sterling Publishing Co., Inc., 2010)

Journals

External links 

 
 
 
 
 
 
 Oxford Kafka Research Centre – information on ongoing international Kafka research
 Translated excerpts from Kafka's Diaries 1910–1923
 
 The Album of Franz Kafka, Franz Kafka receives a tribute in this album of "recomposed photographs".
 Journeys of Franz Kafka Photographs of places where Kafka lived and worked
 Franz Kafka: Manuscripts, drawings and personal letters BBC
 Společnost Franze Kafky a nakladatelství Franze Kafky  Franz Kafka Society and Publishing House in Prague
 What makes something "Kafkaesque"? A Ted talk on Kafka, his works and his legacy, by Noah Tavlin

 
1883 births
1924 deaths
Writers from Prague
People from the Kingdom of Bohemia
Czech Jews
Austro-Hungarian Jews
Czechoslovak Jews
19th-century Austrian people
20th-century Austrian novelists
20th-century Austrian writers
Aphorists
Austro-Hungarian writers
Austrian atheists
Austrian civil servants
Austrian male writers
Austrian socialists
Austrian surrealist writers
Czech atheists
Czech diarists
Czech surrealist writers
Czech writers in German
Czechoslovak writers
Fabulists
Jewish atheists
Jewish existentialists
Jewish novelists
Jewish socialists
Jewish surrealist writers
Magic realism writers
Austrian male novelists
Modernist writers
Absurdist writers
Jewish Czech writers
Weird fiction writers
Charles University alumni
Tuberculosis deaths in Austria
20th-century deaths from tuberculosis